Alapaiwahine was a Princess of the Island of Hawaii and great-grandmother of King David Kalākaua and Queen Lydia Liliuokalani. She was a Naha chiefess: the product of a rare father and daughter marriage uncommon in Hawaiian history.

Biography 
She was probably born in the late 18th century prior to the landing of Captain James Cook on the Hawaiian Islands. She was born into the most powerful family in the island of Hawaii at the time. Her father was Kalaninuiamamao and her mother was his fifth wife, the Naha chiefess Kaolanialii, Kalaninuilamamao's daughter by his wife Kapaihi-a-Ahu. 

Her father (who was thus also her grandfather) was ruling chief (Alii Nui) of the District of Kaū, son of Keaweʻīkekahialiʻiokamoku and Lonomaʻaikanaka. He was once in line to succeed, but due to the contention between him and his higher-ranking brother, Keeaumoku Nui, which led to a war that split the island of Hawaii into separate district kingdoms until Kamehameha I, Keeaumoku’s grandson, united it and the rest of the major islands. The war between the two brothers gave a chance for his cousin, the King Alapai Nui, to take the throne. Alapai was a common name of the Alii family. Although her father lost the throne, her siblings soon regained power. Her brother Chief Kalaniōpuu a Kaiamamao ruled Kohala District, Kona District and Kaū which encompassed the western half of Hawaii island; her brother Keawemauhili married high chiefess Ululani of Hilo and became joint-ruler of Hilo alongside her. 

She was the first cousin once removed of the King Kamehameha I. Her husband was the High Chief Kepookalani, first cousin of Kamehameha, and they had two sons. Her sons were Kamanawa II (ca. 1785–1840) and Kapelakapuokakae.
The House of Kalākaua descends from her son Kamanawa. Kamawana II is sometimes called Kamanawa Ōpio (meaning "younger" or "junior" in the Hawaiian language).

References

18th-century births
Year of death missing
Royalty of the Hawaiian Kingdom
House of Keawe